Melissa Bergland is an Australian actress best known for her role as Jenny Gross in the Seven Network drama Winners & Losers.

Early life
Bergland was born in Adelaide and she attended Pembroke School. Her father died of cancer when she was 14. Bergland then attended Flinders University, where she completed a Bachelor of Arts degree in drama. Bergland then went to the Victorian College of the Arts and she spent six months studying acting in New York. Bergland is also a singer and possesses a mezzo-soprano vocal range.

Career
Bergland created and toured a cabaret show called Blue Eyed Soul at the Adelaide Fringe Festival. Bergland was in the final stages of auditions for a production of Hairspray when she was asked to audition for the role of Jenny Gross in Bevan Lee's new drama Winners & Losers. Bergland wore her own glasses and sported her "signature" red hair, which the producers loved and decided to keep for the character. Bergland made her television acting debut as Jenny.

After wrapping the third series of Winners & Losers, Bergland flew to Los Angeles in August and signed with Untitled Management. Two weeks later she was cast as the lead in Relative Happiness, an independent Canadian film based on the eponymous novel by Lesley Crewe. Bergland stars as Lexie Ivy, a bed and breakfast owner, who is looking for love. Bergland returned to Australia to film Winners & Losers after filming wrapped. Bergland appears in the romantic comedy film Spin Out, alongside Xavier Samuel and Morgan Griffin.

In 2019, Bergland appeared in the fourth episode of the Hulu anthology horror series Into the Dark.

Filmography

Awards and nominations

References

External links
 

Date of birth missing (living people)
Actresses from Adelaide
Living people
Logie Award winners
21st-century Australian actresses
Australian television actresses
Australian film actresses
Flinders University alumni
Victorian College of the Arts alumni
People educated at Pembroke School, Adelaide
Year of birth missing (living people)